The American Sociological Review is a bi-monthly peer-reviewed academic journal covering all aspects of sociology. It is published by SAGE Publications on behalf of the American Sociological Association. It was established in 1936. The editors-in-chief are Arthur S. Alderson (Indiana University-Bloomington) and Dina G. Okamoto (Indiana University-Bloomington).

History
For its first thirty years, the American Sociological Society (now the American Sociological Association) was largely dominated by the sociology department of the University of Chicago, and the quasi-official journal of the association was Chicago's American Journal of Sociology. 

In 1935, the executive committee of the American Sociological Society voted 5 to 4 against disestablishing the American Journal of Sociology as the official journal of society, but the measure was passed on for consideration of the general membership, which voted 2 to 1 to establish a new journal independent of Chicago: the American Sociological Review.

Abstracting and indexing
The journal is abstracted and indexed in:

According to the Journal Citation Reports, its 2019 impact factor is 6.372, ranking it 2nd out of 150 journals in the category "Sociology".

Past editors
The following persons have been editors-in-chief:

References

External links
 (SAGE Publishing)
Official website (ASA)

Publications established in 1936
Sociology journals
SAGE Publishing academic journals
Bimonthly journals
English-language journals
1936 establishments in the United States
American Sociological Association academic journals